Digama costimacula is a moth of the family Erebidae first described by Charles Swinhoe in 1907. It is found in Ghana, Kenya and Nigeria.

References

External links
Zwier, Jaap "Sommeria costimacula Swinhoe, 1907". Aganainae (Snouted Tigers). Retrieved April 18, 2020.

Aganainae
Insects of West Africa
Moths of Africa
Moths described in 1907